Jonas Lund is a Swedish conceptual artist who creates paintings, sculpture, photography, websites and performances that critically reflect on contemporary networked systems and power structures. An example of this is his exhibition "The Fear of Missing Out" (2013) at MAMA, Rotterdam.

Biography 
Lund earned an MA at Piet Zwart Institute, Rotterdam (2013) and a BFA at the Gerrit Rietveld Academy, Amsterdam (2009).

Lund was an Eyebeam resident in 2012.

Work 
Lund's artistic practice involves creating systems and setting up parameters that oftentimes require engagement from the viewer. This results in game-like artworks where tasks are executed according to algorithms or a set of rules. Through his works, Lund investigates the latest issues generated by the increasing digitalisation of contemporary society like authorship, participation and authority. At the same time, he questions the mechanisms of the art world; he challenges the production process, authoritative power and art market practices.

In 2014 Lund created a painting series called Flip City that was first exhibited at Steve Turner in Los Angeles. Each of the forty painting had a GPS trackers attached to the back that shared its current location once a day to the Flip City website. The work aimed to explore the manipulative nature of the art market, in particular the habit of a group of collectors to quickly sell and resell artworks for increased profits, typically referred to as 'flipping'.

In 2018, Lund created his own crypto currency Jonas Lund Token, an ERC-20 token on top of the Ethereum Blockchain, that functions as voting shares in his artistic practice, thus giving birth to a new art form called "performance-art capitalism".

In January 2019, in a performance/installation Lund set up an influencing agency titled Operation Earnest Voice at The Photographers' Gallery in London. The goal of the installation was to reverse Brexit, which caused some controversy and critique from the organisation Leave Means Leave due to The Photographers' Gallery status as a charity, in part funded by the Arts Council England, and as such should not be involved in political campaigning. In a public statement, the gallery said it had followed guidelines from the Charity Commission, consulted with Arts Council England, as well as taken legal advice "to ensure that the project complied with all appropriate regulations especially with regard to publicly funded, charitable institutions". As a result, it "would not adjust or shut down the project".

See also 
 Conceptual Art
 Media Art
 Internet Art

References

External links 
 
 Official Twitter: 

Swedish contemporary artists
Digital artists
Living people
1984 births